Davudak (also Romanized as Dāvūdak; also known as Dābdak, Dābedak, and Dāndak) is a village in Zalaqi-ye Gharbi Rural District, Besharat District, Aligudarz County, Lorestan Province, Iran. At the 2006 census, its population was 37, in 10 families.

References 

Towns and villages in Aligudarz County